Francisco Javier Guerra Trujillo (born December 23, 1992) is a Spanish professional basketball player for Iberostar Tenerife of the Liga ACB.

Career
Guerra made his debut in the Liga ACB with Estudiantes in the first matchday of the 2012–13 season.

Awards and achievements

Spanish national team
FIBA Europe Under-20 Championship: Bronze medal in 2012

References
ACB.com profile

1992 births
Living people
CB Canarias players
CB Estudiantes players
Centers (basketball)
Club Melilla Baloncesto players
Força Lleida CE players
Liga ACB players
Spanish men's basketball players
Sportspeople from Las Palmas
21st-century Spanish people